Zia Cooke (born January 9, 2001) is an American college basketball player for the South Carolina Gamecocks of the Southeastern Conference (SEC). At Rogers High School in Toledo, Ohio, she was rated a five-star recruit by ESPN and earned McDonald's All-American honors. A two-time All-SEC selection in college, Cooke helped South Carolina reach the Final Four of the 2021 NCAA tournament.

Early life and high school career
Cooke grew up playing for a boys youth football team in defiance of her mother, Michelle, who wanted her to join a cheerleading team instead. In seventh grade, she shifted her focus to basketball. Cooke played basketball for Rogers High School in her hometown of Toledo, Ohio. She averaged 21.7 points, 4.6 rebounds, five assists and 3.1 steals per game as a junior. She led her team to the Division II state title, recording 33 points and 14 rebounds in the title game, and was named The Blade Player of the Year. In her senior season, her highlight video drew national attention. As a senior, Cooke averaged 21.7 points, 7.2 rebounds and 4.1 assists per game, winning a second straight state title. She earned Division II Player of the Year honors and repeated as The Blade Player of the Year. Cooke was selected to play in the McDonald's All-American Game. In high school, she also played softball and soccer, and ran track and cross country.

Recruiting
Cooke was rated a five-star recruit and among the top players in the 2019 class by ESPN. On November 5, 2018, she committed to playing college basketball for South Carolina over offers from more than 60 college programs, including Ohio State, Texas, Louisville, Tennessee and Mississippi State.

College career

On November 13, 2019, Cooke scored a freshman season-high 27 points with seven rebounds for South Carolina in a 75–49 win against Dayton. She averaged 12.1 points and 2.9 rebounds per game as a freshman, helping her team achieve a 32–1 record and a No. 1 national ranking. Cooke set a program record for games started by a freshman (33), and was selected to the Southeastern Conference (SEC) All-Freshman Team. On December 31, 2020, she recorded a sophomore season-high 26 points in a 75–59 victory over Florida. On April 2, 2021, at the Final Four of the NCAA tournament, Cooke scored a team-high 25 points in a 66–65 loss to Stanford. As a sophomore, she averaged 15.9 points, three rebounds and two assists per game, receiving First Team All-SEC honors. In her junior season, Cooke was named to the Second Team All-SEC.

National team career
Cooke represented the United States at the 2017 FIBA Under-16 Americas Championship in Argentina. She led her team to the gold medal, averaging 10.8 points per game. She recorded 15 points and four rebounds against Canada in the final. Cooke won her second gold medal at the 2018 FIBA Under-17 World Cup in Belarus, after averaging 7.9 points and 2.9 rebounds per game.

Off the court
As a junior in college, Cooke, along with Caitlin Clark, signed a sponsorship deal with H&R Block as the first two participants in the company's "A Fair Shot" campaign to provide $1 million in support for female college athletes. She has also signed name, image and likeness deals with Dick's Sporting Goods and Bojangles.

References

External links
South Carolina Gamecocks bio

2001 births
Living people
American women's basketball players
Basketball players from Ohio
Sportspeople from Toledo, Ohio
Point guards
South Carolina Gamecocks women's basketball players
McDonald's High School All-Americans
All-American college women's basketball players